Lascoria is a genus of litter moths of the family Erebidae. The genus was erected by Francis Walker in 1859.

Species
 Lascoria alucitalis Guenée, 1854
 Lascoria ambigualis Walker, 1866 – ambiguous moth
 Lascoria antigone Schaus, 1916
 Lascoria aon Druce, 1891
 Lascoria arenosa Schaus, 1916
 Lascoria cristata Schaus, 1916
 Lascoria maronialis Schaus, 1916
 Lascoria naupalis Schaus, 1916
 Lascoria orneodalis Guenée, 1854

References

Herminiinae
Moth genera